The Croatian Heraldic and Vexillological Association, known as CHVA for short, is a non-governmental and non-profit institution which studies Croatian heraldry and vexillology. It was established in 2006. 

The association's president is Željko Heimer who runs the Flags and Arms of the Modern Era web site. The CHVA participates in International Congresses of Genealogical and Heraldic Sciences.

External links 
Croatian Heraldic and Vexillological Association

Heraldic and Vexillological Association
Heraldic societies
Clubs and societies in Croatia
Organizations established in 2006
2006 establishments in Croatia
International Federation of Vexillological Associations